Rocky Ayres Calmus (born August 1, 1979) is an American former college and professional football player who was a linebacker in the National Football League (NFL) for three seasons during the early 2000s.  He played college football for the University of Oklahoma, earned consensus All-American honors twice, and was recognized as the nation's top college linebacker.  The Tennessee Titans picked him in the third round of the 2002 NFL Draft.

Early years
Calmus was born in Tulsa, Oklahoma.  He is one of several high school football players to reach the professional ranks from the highly successful football program at Jenks High School in Jenks, Oklahoma.  There, he was a star linebacker and running back on a team ranked third in nation and helped start a run to six consecutive Oklahoma Class 6A state championships.

College career
While attending the University of Oklahoma, Calmus played for coach John Blake and Bob Stoops's Oklahoma Sooners football team from 1998 to 2001. He was a three-time first-team All-Big 12 selection (1999, 2000, 2001), and a two-time consensus first-team All-American (2000, 2001). Calmus was recognized as the Big 12 Defensive Player of the Year as a junior and senior, and won the Butkus Award as the nation's premier college linebacker following his senior season in 2001. Calmus was a key defensive starter on the 2000 Sooners team that defeated the Florida State Seminoles 13–2 in the Orange Bowl to win the BCS National Championship.

Professional career
Signed by the Indianapolis Colts for the  season, he appeared in no regular season games for the team. Hampered by injuries throughout his professional career, he retired after the 2005 season. As of 2010 he owned a landscaping business in Franklin, Tennessee.

Personal
His uncle, Dick Calmus, was a baseball pitcher who was signed as a bonus baby and played for the Los Angeles Dodgers and Chicago Cubs in the 1960s.

References

External links
 "All-American: Rocky Calmus" at Oklahoma Sooners football official website
 Rocky Calmus at NFL.com

1979 births
Living people
All-American college football players
American football linebackers
Indianapolis Colts players
Oklahoma Sooners football players
Players of American football from Oklahoma
Sportspeople from Tulsa, Oklahoma
Tennessee Titans players